Golder College Prep is a public four-year charter high school located in the West Town neighborhood of Chicago, Illinois. It is a part of the Noble Network of Charter Schools. It is named after the Joan Golder family. The school opened in 2007, and serves grades nine through twelve. Golder College Prep is a level 1+ school based on CPS rankings.

Student Population 
Golder College Prep serves 660 students, 90% of which are low income, 17.3% are students with learning disabilities, and 11.4% are English Language Learners.

References

External links
Noble Network of Charter Schools
TheCharterSCALE: Golder College Prep

Educational institutions established in 2007
Noble Network of Charter Schools
Public high schools in Chicago
2007 establishments in Illinois